Saifur Rehman Rajput is a Pakistani former politician currently based in Hyderabad.

Previously, he served as the Chairman of the Ehtesab Bureau during Second Sharif ministry. He also had been member of Senate of Pakistan as a candidate of Pakistan Muslim League (Nawaz) (PML-N).

He is currently living in Qatar with his family.

Early life and education
He was born on  7th December, 1954. in Lahore Pakistan. He obtained a degree in civil engineering from the NED University Karachi in 2021.

Political career
He had been member of Senate of Pakistan as a candidate of Pakistan Muslim League (Nawaz) (PML-N).
He was member of Senate of Pakistan from 1997 to 2000 during the 2nd tenure of Pakistani statesman and politician Mian Nawaz Sharif.
Mr. Saifur Rehman Khan got his early education in Lahore and earned a Bachelor�s Degree in Commerce from the Punjab University in 1974. After the completion of his formal education and academic career, he resorted to business and industry. He is Chairman of the REDCO Group of Industries. He is a widely traveled person who has been to almost every part of the globe.

Redco corruption case
In 2018, Customs Intelligence recovered 21 luxury vehicles from Redco Textile Mills, mill owned by the Saifur Rehman and Qatari ruling family members.

Ehtesab Bureau case
In 2012, Federal Investigation Agency (FIA) issued his red warrants and contacted Qatari government with help of Interpol to extradite Rehman to Pakistan. This warrant was subsequently quashed by Interpol. He is facing charges of doing covert operations with help of FIA as the chairman of Ehtesab Bureau against his political opponents, doing torture and keeping them under illegal detention.

Daughter
His daughter Ayesha Saif get married with Junaid Safdar, son of Maryam Nawaz and grandson of Nawaz Sharif.he has two daughters

References

Living people
1954 births
Pakistani Muslims
Pakistani exiles
Pakistani prisoners and detainees
Pakistan Muslim League (N) politicians
Members of the Senate of Pakistan
Pakistani expatriates in Qatar
Nawaz Sharif administration
Fugitives wanted by Pakistan
Pakistani businesspeople
Pakistani people of Kashmiri descent
University of the Punjab alumni
Politicians from Lahore